Crumpler is a surname. Notable people with the surname include:

 Alge Crumpler (born 1977), former American football player
 Carlester Crumpler Jr. (born 1971), former American football player
 Larry Crumpler, geologist and volcanologist
 Rebecca Lee Crumpler (1831–1895), physician